Valeria Pereyra (born February 12, 1996) is an Argentine artistic gymnast. She competed at the 2012 Summer Olympics.

References

1996 births
Living people
Argentine female artistic gymnasts
Gymnasts at the 2012 Summer Olympics
Olympic gymnasts of Argentina
Gymnasts at the 2019 Pan American Games
Pan American Games competitors for Argentina
21st-century Argentine women